The official history of the Italy national football team began in 1910, when Italy played its first international match. Since then, the Italy national team has been one of the most successful football teams, winning four World Cups and two European Championships.

1899–1938: Origins and first two World Cups in 1934 and 1938

An early attempt to create an Italian national team occurred on 30 April 1899, when an Italian selection played a Swiss eleven, losing 0–2 in Torino.

The team's first match was held in Milan on 15 May 1910. Italy defeated France by a score of 6–2, with Italy's first goal scored by Pietro Lana. The Italian team played with a (2–3–5) system and consisted of: De Simoni; Varisco, Calì; Trerè, Fossati, Capello; Debernardi, Rizzi, Cevenini I, Lana, Boiocchi. First captain of the team was Francesco Calì.

The first success in an official tournament came with the bronze medal in the 1928 Summer Olympics, held in Amsterdam. After losing the semi-final against Uruguay, an 11–3 victory against Egypt secured third place in the competition. In the 1927–30 and 1933–35 Central European International Cup, Italy achieved the first place out of five Central European teams, topping the group with 11 points in both editions of the tournament. Italy would also later win the gold medal at the 1936 Summer Olympics with a 2–1 victory in extra time in the gold medal match over Austria on 15 August 1936.

After declining to participate in the inaugural World Cup (1930, in Uruguay) the Italy national team won two consecutive editions of the tournament in 1934 and 1938, under the direction of coach Vittorio Pozzo and the performance of Giuseppe Meazza, who is considered one of the best Italian football players of all time by some. Italy hosted the 1934 World Cup, and played their first ever World Cup match in a 7–1 win over the United States in Rome. Italy defeated Czechoslovakia 2–1 in extra time in the final in Rome, with goals by Raimundo Orsi and Angelo Schiavio to achieve their first World cup title in 1934. They achieved their second title in 1938 in a 4–2 defeat of Hungary, with two goals by Gino Colaussi and two goals by Silvio Piola in the World Cup that followed. Rumour has it, before the 1938 finals fascist Italian Prime Minister Benito Mussolini was to have sent a telegram to the team, saying "Vincere o morire!" (literally translated as "Win or die!"). However, no record remains of such a telegram, and World Cup player Pietro Rava said, when interviewed, "No, no, no, that's not true. He sent a telegram wishing us well, but no never 'win or die'."

1946–1966: Post-World War II

In 1949, 10 of the 11 players in the team's initial line-up were killed in a plane crash that affected Torino, winners of the previous five Serie A titles. Italy did not advance further than the first round of the 1950 World Cup, as they were weakened severely due to the air disaster. The team had travelled by boat rather than by plane, fearing another accident.

In the World Cup finals of 1954 and 1962, Italy failed to progress past the first round, and did not qualify for the 1958 World Cup due to a 2–1 defeat to Northern Ireland in the last match of the qualifying round. Italy did not take part in the first edition of the European Championship in 1960 (then known as the European Nations Cup), and was knocked out by the Soviet Union in the first round of the 1964 European Nations' Cup qualifying.

Their participation in the 1966 World Cup was ended by a 0–1 defeat at the hands of North Korea. Despite being the tournament favourites, the Azzurri, whose 1966 squad included Gianni Rivera and Giacomo Bulgarelli, were eliminated in the first round by the semi-professional North Koreans. The Italian team was bitterly condemned upon their return home, while North Korean scorer Pak Doo-ik was celebrated as the David who killed Goliath. Upon Italy's return home, furious fans threw fruit and rotten tomatoes at their transport bus at the airport.

1968–1974: European champions and World Cup runners-up

In 1968, Italy participated in their first European Championship, hosting the tournament and winning their first major competition since the 1938 World Cup, beating Yugoslavia in Rome for the title. The match is the only European Championship or World Cup final to go to a replay. After extra time the final ended in a 1–1 draw, and in the days before penalty shootouts, the rules required the match to be replayed a few days later. Italy won the replay 2–0 (with goals from Gigi Riva and Pietro Anastasi) to take the trophy.

In the 1970 World Cup, exploiting the performances of European champions' players like Giacinto Facchetti, Gianni Rivera and Gigi Riva and with a new centre-forward Roberto Boninsegna, the team were able to come back to a World Cup final match after 32 years. They reached this result after one of the most famous matches in football history—the "Game of the Century", the 1970 World Cup semifinal between Italy and Germany that Italy won 4–3 in extra time, with five of the seven goals coming in extra time. They were later defeated by Brazil in the final 4–1. The cycle of international successes ended in the 1974 World Cup, when the team was eliminated by Grzegorz Lato's Polish team in the first round.

1978–1986: Third World Cup generation

In the 1978 FIFA World Cup in Argentina, a new team of Italian players, the most famous being Paolo Rossi, came to the international stage. Italy was the only team in the tournament to beat the eventual champions and host team Argentina. Second-round games against West Germany (0–0), Austria (1–0) and Netherlands (1–2) led Italy to the third-place final, where the team was defeated by Brazil 2–1. In the match that eliminated Italy from the tournament against the Netherlands, Italian goalkeeper Dino Zoff was beaten by a long-distance shot from Arie Haan, and Zoff was criticized for the defeat. Italy hosted the 1980 UEFA European Football Championship, the first edition to be held between eight teams instead of four, automatically qualifying for the finals as hosts. After two draws with Spain and Belgium and a narrow 1–0 win over England, Italy were beaten by Czechoslovakia in the third-place match on penalties 9–8 after Fulvio Collovati missed his kick.

After a scandal in Serie A where some National team players such as Paolo Rossi were prosecuted and suspended for match fixing and illegal betting, the Azzurri qualified for the second round of the 1982 World Cup after three uninspiring draws against Poland, Peru and Cameroon. Having been loudly criticized, the Italian team decided on a press black-out from then on, with only coach Enzo Bearzot and captain Dino Zoff appointed to speak to the press.

Italy's regrouped in the second round group, a group of death with Argentina and Brazil. In the opener, Italy prevailed 2–1 over Argentina, with Italy's goals, both left-footed strikes, were scored by Marco Tardelli and Antonio Cabrini. After Brazil defeated Argentina 3–1, Italy needed to win in order to advance to the semi-finals. Twice Italy went in the lead with Paolo Rossi's goals, and twice Brazil came back. When Falcão scored to make it 2–2, Brazil would have been through on goal difference, but in the 74th minute Rossi scored the winning goal, for a hat-trick, in a crowded penalty area to send Italy to the semifinals after one of the greatest games in World Cup history. Italy then progressed to the semi-final where they defeated Poland with two goals from Rossi.

In the final, Italy met West Germany, who had advanced by a penalty shootout victory against France. The first half ended scoreless, after Antonio Cabrini missed a penalty awarded for a Hans-Peter Briegel foul on Bruno Conti. In the second half Paolo Rossi again scored the first goal, and while the Germans were pushing forward in search of an equaliser, Marco Tardelli and substitute Alessandro Altobelli finalised two contropiede counterattacks to make it 3–0. Paul Breitner scored home West Germany's consolation goal seven minutes from the end.

Tardelli's cry, "Gol! Gol!" was one of the defining images of Italy's 1982 World Cup triumph. Paolo Rossi won the Golden Boot with six goals as well as the Golden Ball Award for the best player of the tournament, and 40-year-old captain-goalkeeper Dino Zoff became the oldest player to win the World Cup.

However, Italy failed to qualify for the 1984 European Championship. Italy then entered as reigning champions in the 1986 World Cup but were eliminated by reigning European Champions, France, in the round of 16.

1988–1994: World Cup runners-up
In 1986, Azeglio Vicini was appointed as new head coach, replacing Bearzot. New coach conceded a chance to young players, such as Ciro Ferrara and Gianluca Vialli: Sampdoria striker scored goals that gave Italy 1988 European Championship pass. He was also shown like Altobelli's possibly successor, having his same goal attitude. Both forwards stroke the target in Germany, where Soviet Union defeated azzurri in semi-finals.

Italy hosted the World Cup for the second time in 1990. The Italian attack featured talented forwards Salvatore Schillaci and a young Roberto Baggio. Italy played nearly all of their matches in Rome and did not concede a single goal in their first five matches, however, they lost the semi-final in Naples to defending champion Argentina. Argentinian player Maradona, who played for Napoli, made comments prior to the game pertaining to the North–South inequality in Italy and the risorgimento, asking Neapolitans to root for Argentina in the game. Italy lost 4–3 on penalty kicks following a 1–1 draw after extra time. Schillaci's first-half opener was equalised in the second half by Claudio Caniggia's header for Argentina. Aldo Serena missed the final penalty kick with Roberto Donadoni also having his penalty saved by goalkeeper Sergio Goycochea. Italy went on to defeat England 2–1 in the third-place match in Bari, with Schillaci scoring the winning goal on a penalty to become the tournament's top scorer with six goals. Italy then failed to qualify for the 1992 European Championship. In November 1993, FIFA ranked Italy first in the FIFA World Rankings for their first time since the ranking system was introduced in December 1992.

At the 1994 World Cup in the United States, Italy lost the opening match against Ireland 0–1 at the Giants Stadium near New York City. After a 1–0 win against Norway in New York City and a 1–1 draw with Mexico at the RFK Stadium in Washington, D.C., Italy advanced from Group E based on goals scored among the four teams tied on points. During their round of 16 match at the Foxboro Stadium near Boston, Italy was down 0–1 late against Nigeria, but Baggio rescued Italy with an equaliser in the 88th minute and a penalty in extra time to take the win. Baggio scored another late goal against Spain at their quarter-final match in Boston to seal a 2–1 win and two goals against Bulgaria in their semi-final match in New York City for another 2–1 win.

In the final, which took place in Los Angeles's Rose Bowl stadium 2,700 miles (4,320 km) and three time zones away from the Atlantic Northeast part of the United States where they had played all their previous matches, Italy, who had 24 hours less rest than Brazil, played 120 minutes of scoreless football, taking the match to a penalty shootout, the first time a World Cup final was settled in a penalty shootout. Italy lost the subsequent shootout 3–2 after Baggio, who had been playing with the aid of a pain-killer injection and a heavily bandaged hamstring, missed the final penalty kick of the match, shooting over the crossbar.

1996–2000: European Championship runners-up
Italy did not progress beyond the group stage at the finals of Euro 1996. Having defeated Russia 2–1 but losing to the Czech Republic by the same score, Italy required a win to be sure of progressing. Gianfranco Zola failed to convert a decisive penalty in a 0–0 draw against Germany, who eventually won the tournament. During the qualifying campaign for the 1998 World Cup, Italy drew 0–0 to England on the last day of Group 2 matches as Italy finished in second place, one point behind England. Italy were then required to go through the play-off against Russia, advancing 2–1 on aggregate on 15 November 1997 with the winner coming from Pierluigi Casiraghi. In the final tournament, Italy found themselves in another critical shootout for the third World Cup in a row. The Italian side, where Alessandro Del Piero and Baggio renewed the controversial staffetta ("relay") between Mazzola and Rivera from 1970, held the eventual World Champions and host team France to a 0–0 draw after extra time in the quarter-finals, but lost 4–3 in the shootout. With two goals scored in this tournament, Baggio is still the only Italian player to have scored in three different FIFA World Cup editions.

In the Euro 2000, another shootout decided Italy's fate but this time in their favour when defeating the co-hosts the Netherlands in the semi final. Italian goalkeeper Francesco Toldo saved one penalty during the match and two in the shootout, while the Dutch players missed one other penalty during the match and one during the shootout with a rate of one penalty scored out of six attempts. Emerging star Francesco Totti scored his penalty with a cucchiaio ("spoon") chip. Italy finished the tournament as runners-up, losing the final 2–1 against France (to a golden goal in extra time) after conceding les Bleus equalising goal just 30 seconds before the expected end of injury time (93rd minute). After the defeat, coach Dino Zoff resigned in protest after being criticized by Milan club president and politician Silvio Berlusconi.

2000–2004: Trapattoni Era
In the 2002 World Cup, a 2–0 victory against Ecuador with two Christian Vieri goals was followed by a series of controversial matches. During the match against Croatia, two goals were disallowed resulting in a 2–1 defeat for Italy. Despite two goals being ruled for borderline offsides, a late headed goal from Alessandro Del Piero helped Italy to a 1–1 draw with Mexico proving enough to advance to the knockout stages. However, co-host country South Korea eliminated Italy in the round of 16 by a score of 2–1. The game was highly controversial with members of the Italian team, most notably striker Francesco Totti and coach Giovanni Trapattoni, suggesting a conspiracy to eliminate Italy from the competition. Trapattoni even obliquely accused FIFA of ordering the official to ensure a Korean victory so that one of the two host nations would remain in the tournament. The most contentious decisions by the game referee Byron Moreno were an early penalty awarded to South Korea (saved by Buffon), a golden goal by Damiano Tommasi ruled offside, and the sending off of Totti after being presented with a second yellow card for an alleged dive in the penalty area. FIFA President Sepp Blatter stated that the linesmen had been a "disaster" and admitted that Italy suffered from bad offside calls during the group matches, but he denied conspiracy allegations. While questioning Totti's sending off by Moreno, Blatter refused to blame Italy's loss entirely on the referees, stating: "Italy's elimination is not only down to referees and linesmen who made human not premeditated errors ... Italy made mistakes both in defense and in attack."

A three-way five point tie in the group stage of the 2004 European Championship left Italy as the "odd man out", as they failed to qualify for the quarter finals after finishing behind Denmark and Sweden on the basis of number of goals scored in matches among the tied teams. Italy's winning goal scored during stoppage time giving them a 2–1 victory over Bulgaria by Antonio Cassano proved futile, ending the team's tournament.

Fourth World Cup title in 2006

The summer of 2004 marked the choice, by FIGC, to appoint Marcello Lippi for Italy's bench. He made his debut in an upset 2–0 defeat in Iceland but then managed to qualify for 2006 World Cup. Italy's campaign in the tournament hosted by Germany was accompanied by open pessimism due to the controversy caused by the 2006 Serie A scandal, however these negative predictions were then refuted, as the Azzurri eventually won their fourth World Cup.

Italy won their opening game against Ghana 2–0, with goals from Andrea Pirlo (40th minute) and substitute Vincenzo Iaquinta (83rd minute). The team performance was judged the best among the opening games by FIFA President Sepp Blatter.

The second match was a less convincing 1–1 draw with United States, with Alberto Gilardino's diving header equalized by a Cristian Zaccardo own goal. After the equaliser, midfielder Daniele De Rossi and the United States's Pablo Mastroeni and Eddie Pope were sent off, leaving only nine men on the field for nearly the entirety of the second half, but the score remained unchanged despite a controversial decision when Gennaro Gattuso's shot was deflected in but disallowed because of an offside ruling. The same happened at the other end when U.S. winger DaMarcus Beasley's goal was not given due to teammate Brian McBride being ruled offside. De Rossi was suspended for four matches for elbowing McBride in the face and only returned for the final match.

Italy finished first in Group E with a 2–0 win against the Czech Republic, with goals from defender Marco Materazzi (26th minute) and striker Filippo Inzaghi (87th minute), advancing to the Round of 16 in the knockout stages, where they faced Australia. In this match, Materazzi was controversially sent off early in the second half (53rd minute) after an attempted two-footed tackle on Australian midfielder Marco Bresciano. In stoppage time a controversial penalty kick was awarded to the Azzurri when referee Luis Medina Cantalejo ruled that Lucas Neill fouled Fabio Grosso. Francesco Totti converted into the upper corner of the goal past Mark Schwarzer for a 1–0 win.

In the quarterfinals Italy beat Ukraine 3–0. Gianluca Zambrotta opened the scoring early (in the sixth minute) with a left-footed shot from outside the penalty area after a quick exchange with Totti created enough space. Luca Toni added two more goals in the second half (59th and 69th minute), as Ukraine pressed forward but were not able to score, hitting the crossbar and requiring several saves from Gianluigi Buffon and a goal-line clearance from Zambrotta. Afterwards, manager Marcello Lippi dedicated the victory to former Italian international Gianluca Pessotto, who was in the hospital recovering from an apparent suicide attempt.

In the semi-finals, Italy beat hosts Germany 2–0 with the two goals coming in the last two minutes of extra time. After a back-and-forth half-hour of extra time during which Alberto Gilardino and Gianluca Zambrotta struck the post and the crossbar respectively, Fabio Grosso scored in the 119th minute after a disguised Andrea Pirlo pass found him open in the penalty area for a bending left-footed shot into the far corner past German goalkeeper Jens Lehmann's dive. Substitute striker Alessandro Del Piero then sealed the victory by scoring with the last kick of the game at the end of a swift counterattack by Cannavaro, Totti and Gilardino.

The Azzurri won their fourth World Cup, defeating their long-time rivals France in Berlin, on 9 July, 5–3 on penalty kicks after a 1–1 draw at the end of extra time in the final. French captain Zinedine Zidane opened the scoring in the seventh minute with a chipped penalty kick, awarded for a controversial foul by Materazzi on Florent Malouda. Twelve minutes later, a header by Materazzi from a corner kick by Pirlo brought Italy even. In the second half, a potential winning goal by Toni was disallowed for a very close offside call by linesman Luc La Rossa. In the 110th minute, Zidane (playing in the last match of his career) was sent off by referee Horacio Elizondo for headbutting Materazzi in the chest after a verbal exchange; Italy then won the penalty shootout 5–3, with the winner scored by Grosso; the crucial penalty miss from the French being David Trezeguet's, the same player who scored the golden goal for France in the Euro 2000. Trezeguet's attempt hit the crossbar, then shot down after its impact, and just stayed ahead of the line.

Ten different players scored for Italy in the tournament, and five goals out of twelve were scored by substitutes, while four goals were scored by defenders. Seven players — Gianluigi Buffon, Fabio Cannavaro, Gianluca Zambrotta, Andrea Pirlo, Gennaro Gattuso, Francesco Totti and Luca Toni — were named to the 23-man tournament All Star Team. Buffon also won the Lev Yashin Award, given to the best goalkeeper of the tournament; he conceded only two goals in the tournament's seven matches, the first an own goal by Zaccardo and the second from Zidane's penalty kick in the final, and remained unbeaten for 460 consecutive minutes.
In honour of Italy winning the FIFA World Cup for a fourth time, all members of the World Cup-winning squad were awarded the Italian Order of Merit of Cavaliere.

2006–2010: Post-World Cup decline
Marcello Lippi, who had announced his resignation three days after the World Cup triumph, was replaced by Roberto Donadoni as the new coach of the Azzurri. Italy played in the 2008 UEFA European Football Championship qualifying Group B, along with France. Italy won the group, with France being the runner-up. On 14 February 2007, Italy climbed to first in the FIFA World Rankings from second, with a total of 1,488 points, 37 points ahead of second ranked Argentina. This was the second time in the Azzurri'''s history that it had been ranked in first place, the first time being in 1993; they would also be ranked first several times throughout 2007, also in April–June and September.

In Euro 2008, the Azzurri lost 3–0 to the Netherlands. The following game against Romania ended 1–1, with a goal by Christian Panucci that came only one minute after Romania's Adrian Mutu capitalized on a mistake by Gianluca Zambrotta to give Romania the lead. The result was preserved by Gianluigi Buffon who saved a penalty kick from Mutu in the 80th minute.

The final group game against France, a rematch of the 2006 World Cup Final, was a 2–0 Italy win. Andrea Pirlo scored from the penalty spot after a foul and red card for France defender Eric Abidal, and later a free kick by Daniele De Rossi took a deflection resulting Italy's second goal. Romania, entering the day a point ahead of the Italians in Group C, lost to the Netherlands 2–0, allowing Italy to pass into the quarter finals against eventual champions Spain, where they lost 2–4 on penalties after a 0–0 draw after 120 minutes. Within a week after the game, Roberto Donadoni's contract was terminated and Marcello Lippi was rehired as coach.

Italy qualified for their first ever FIFA Confederations Cup held in South Africa in June 2009 by virtue of winning the 2006 World Cup. They won their opening match of the tournament by a score of 3–1 against the United States, but subsequent defeats to Egypt (0–1) and Brazil (0–3) meant that they only finished third in the group on goals scored, and were eliminated.

The national football team of Italy qualified for the 2010 FIFA World Cup after playing home games at Stadio Friuli, Stadio Via del Mare, Stadio San Nicola, Stadio Olimpico di Torino and Stadio Ennio Tardini. In October 2009, they achieved qualification after drawing with the Republic of Ireland 2–2. On 4 December 2009, the draw for the World Cup was made: Italy would be in Group F alongside three underdog teams: Paraguay, New Zealand and Slovakia.

At the 2010 World Cup in South Africa, reigning champions Italy were unexpectedly eliminated in the first round, finishing last place in their group. After being held to 1–1 draws by Paraguay and New Zealand, they suffered a 3–2 loss to Slovakia. It was the first time Italy failed to win a single game at a World Cup finals tournament, and in doing so became the third nation to be eliminated in the first round while holding the World Cup crown; the first being Brazil in 1966 and the second France in 2002. Coincidentally, France who had been Italy's adversaries and the losing finalist in the 2006 World Cup, were also eliminated without winning a game in the first round in South Africa, making it the first time ever that neither finalist of the previous edition were able to reach the second round.

2010–2014: European Championship runners-up

Marcello Lippi stepped down after Italy's World Cup campaign and was replaced by Cesare Prandelli, although Lippi's successor had already been announced before the tournament. Italy began their campaign with Prandelli with a 1–0 loss to the Ivory Coast in a friendly match. Then, during a Euro 2012 qualifier, Italy came back from behind to defeat Estonia 2–1. In the next Euro qualifier, Italy dominated the Faroe Islands 5–0. Italy then tied 0–0 with Northern Ireland. Five days later, Italy played Serbia; however, Serbian fans in Stadio Luigi Ferraris began to riot, throwing flares and shooting fireworks onto the pitch, subsequently causing the abandonment of the game. Upon UEFA Disciplinary Review, Italy was awarded a 3–0 victory that propelled them to the top of their group. In their first match of 2011, Italy drew 1–1 a friendly with Germany at Dortmund, in the same stadium where they beat Germany 2–0 to advance to the final of the 2006 World Cup. In March 2011, Italy won 1–0 over Slovenia to again secure its spot at the top of the qualification table. They then defeated Ukraine 2–0 in a friendly, despite being reduced to ten men for the late stages of the match. With their 3–0 defeat of Estonia in another Euro 2012 qualifier, Prandelli's Italy secured the table lead and also achieved 9 undefeated games in a row since their initial debacle. The streak was ended on 7 June 2011 by Trapattoni's current charges, the Republic of Ireland, with Italy losing 0–2 in a friendly in Liège.

At the beginning of the second season under coach Prandelli, on 10 August 2011, Italy defeated the reigning world champions Spain for 2–1 in a friendly match played in Bari's Stadio San Nicola, but lost in a friendly to the United States, 1–0, on home soil on 29 February 2012.

Italy started their Euro 2012 campaign with a 1–1 draw to current reigning European and World champions Spain. In the following match, they draw 1–1 against Croatia. They finished second in their group behind Spain by beating the Republic of Ireland 2–0, which earned them a quarter-final match against the winners of group D, England. After a mostly one-sided affair in which Italy failed to take their chances, they managed to beat England on penalty kicks, even though they were down early in the shootout. A save by goalkeeper Gianluigi Buffon put them ahead after a chip shot from Andrea Pirlo. Prandelli's side won the shootout 4–2.

In their next game, the first semi-final of the competition, they faced Germany team who were tipped by many to be the next European champions. However, two first-half goals by Mario Balotelli saw Germany sent home, and the Italians went through to the finals to face the title defenders Spain.

In the final, however, they were unable to repeat their earlier performance against Spain, falling 4–0 to lose the championship. Prandelli's men were further undone by the string of injuries which left them playing with ten men for the last half-hour, as substitute Thiago Motta was forced to go off after all three substitutions had been made.

During the 2013 Confederations Cup in Brazil, Italy started in a group with Mexico, Japan and Brazil. After beating Mexico 2–1 and Japan 4–3, Italy eventually lost their final group game against tournament hosts Brazil 4–2. Italy then faced Spain in the semi-finals, in a rematch of the Euro 2012 final. Italy lost 7–6 (0–0 after extra time) in a penalty shoot-out after Leonardo Bonucci failed to score his kick. Prandelli was praised for his tactics against the current World Cup and European champions. Italy was then able to win the match for the third place by defeating Uruguay with the penalty score of 5–4 (2–2 after extra time).

Italy was drawn in UEFA Group B for the 2014 World Cup qualification campaign. They won  the qualifying group without losing a match. Despite this successful run they were not seeded in pot 1 for the final seeding. In December 2013, Italy was drawn in Group D against Costa Rica, England and Uruguay. In its first match, Italy defeated England 2–1. However, in the second group stage match, underdogs Costa Rica beat the Italians 1–0. In Italy's last group match, they were knocked out by Uruguay 1–0, due in part to two controversial calls from referee Marco Antonio Rodríguez (Mexico): in the 59th minute, midfielder Claudio Marchisio was sent off for a questionable tackle. Later in the 80th minute, with the teams knotted at 0–0 which would have sent Italy to the next round, Uruguayan striker Luis Suárez bit defender Giorgio Chiellini on the shoulder but was not sent off. Uruguay went on to score moments later in the 81st minute with a Diego Godín header from a corner kick, winning the game 1–0 and eliminating Italy. This marked Italy's second consecutive failure to reach the round of 16 at the World Cup finals. Shortly after this loss, coach Cesare Prandelli resigned.

2014–2016: Euro 2016 campaign
The successful former Juventus manager Antonio Conte was selected to replace Cesare Prandelli as coach after the 2014 World Cup. Conte's debut as manager was against 2014 World Cup semi-finalists the Netherlands, in which Italy won 2–0. Italy's first defeat under Conte came ten games in to his empowerment from a 1–0 international friendly loss against Portugal on 16 June 2015. On 10 October 2015, Italy qualified for Euro 2016, courtesy of a 3–1 win over Azerbaijan; the result meant that Italy had managed to go 50 games unbeaten in European qualifiers. Three days later, with a 2–1 win over Norway, Italy topped their Euro 2016 qualifying group with 24 points; four points clear of second placed Croatia. However, with a similar fate to the 2014 World Cup group stage draw, Italy were not top seeded into the first pot. This had Italy see a draw with Belgium, Sweden and the Republic of Ireland in Group E.

On 4 April 2016, it was announced that Antonio Conte would step down as Italy coach after Euro 2016 to become head coach of English club Chelsea at the start of the 2016–17 Premier League season. The 23-man squad, which was initially criticized by many fans and members of the media for its tactics and level of quality, saw notable absences with Andrea Pirlo and Sebastian Giovinco controversially left out and Claudio Marchisio and Marco Verratti omitted due to injury. Italy opened Euro 2016 with a 2–0 victory over Belgium on 13 June. Italy qualified for the round of 16 with one game to spare on 17 June with a lone goal by Éder for the victory against Sweden; the first time they won the second group game in a major international tournament since Euro 2000. Italy also finished top of the group for the first time in a major tournament since the 2006 World Cup. Italy defeated reigning European champions Spain 2–0 in the round of 16 match on 27 June. Italy then faced off against the reigning World champions, rivals Germany, in the quarter-finals. Mesut Özil opened the scoring in the 65th minute for Germany, before Leonardo Bonucci converted a penalty in the 78th minute for Italy. The score remained 1–1 after extra time and Germany beat Italy 6–5 in the ensuing penalty shoot-out. It was the first time Germany overcame Italy in a major tournament, however, since the win occurred on penalties, it is statistically considered a draw.

Failure to qualify for 2018 World Cup
For the 2018 FIFA World Cup qualification Italy were placed into the second pot due to being in 17th place in the FIFA World Rankings at the time of the group draws; Italy were drawn with Spain from pot one on 25 July 2015. After Conte's planned departure following Euro 2016, Gian Piero Ventura took over as manager for the team, on 18 July 2016, signing a two-year contract. His first match at the helm was a friendly against France, held at the Stadio San Nicola on 1 September, which ended in a 3–1 loss. Four days later, he won his first competitive match in charge of Italy, the team's opening 2018 FIFA World Cup qualifier against Israel at Haifa, which ended in a 3–1 victory for Italy.

After Italy won all of their qualifying matches except for a 1–1 draw at home to Macedonia, as well as a 1–1 draw with Spain at home on 6 October 2016, and a 3–0 loss away to Spain on 2 September 2017, Italy finished in Group G in second place, five points behind Spain. Italy were then required to go through the play-off against Sweden. After a 1–0 aggregate loss to Sweden, on 13 November 2017, Italy failed to qualify for the 2018 FIFA World Cup, the first time they failed to qualify for the World Cup since 1958. Immediately following the match, veterans Giorgio Chiellini, Andrea Barzagli, Daniele De Rossi and captain Gianluigi Buffon all declared their retirement from the national team. On 15 November 2017, Ventura was dismissed as head coach and on 20 November 2017, Carlo Tavecchio resigned as president of the Italian Football Federation.

2018–present: Second European title and failure to qualify for the 2022 World Cup
On 5 February 2018, the Italy U21 manager Luigi Di Biagio was appointed as the caretaker manager of the senior team. On 17 March 2018, despite the initial decision to retire by veterans Buffon and Chiellini, they were both called up for Italy's March 2018 friendlies by caretaker manager Di Biagio. Following the March friendlies against Argentina and England in which Italy were defeated and drew respectively, on 12 April 2018, Italy dropped six places to their lowest FIFA World Ranking at the time, to 20th place. On 14 May 2018, Roberto Mancini was announced as the new manager. On 28 May 2018, Italy won their first match under Mancini, a 2–1 victory in a friendly over Saudi Arabia. On 16 August 2018, in the FIFA World Ranking that followed the 2018 World Cup, Italy dropped two places to their lowest ever ranking, to 21st place. On 7 September 2018, Italy participated in the inaugural UEFA Nations League, drawing their first match of the tournament against Poland in Bologna with a score of 1–1.

On 12 October 2019, Italy qualified for Euro 2020 with three matches to spare after a 2–0 home win over Greece. On 18 November, Italy finished Group J with ten wins in all ten of their matches, becoming only the sixth national side to qualify for a European Championship with a 100 per cent record, and the seventh instance, after France (1992 and 2004), Czech Republic (2000), Germany, Spain (both 2012) and England (2016).

On 17 March 2020, UEFA confirmed that Euro 2020 had been postponed by one year in response to the COVID-19 pandemic in Europe. On 18 November 2020, with a 2–0 away win over Bosnia and Herzegovina, Italy finished first in their 2020–21 UEFA Nations League group and qualified for the Finals of the tournament.

In June 2021 Italy started its venture at the UEFA Euro 2020 in the Group A, along with Switzerland, Turkey, and Wales. Being one of the host nations, Italy played all three group games at home at Rome's Stadio Olimpico. Italy opened the tournament with a 3–0 win over Turkey, with Turkish defender Merih Demiral scoring an own goal to give the Italians the lead in the 53rd minute, before Ciro Immobile and Lorenzo Insigne netted two further attempts. Italy then managed to overcome a highly defensive Switzerland with another 3–0 triumph, with Manuel Locatelli scoring twice and Ciro Immobile netting the last goal to seal a place into the round of 16 with a game to spare, despite captain Giorgio Chiellini suffering an injury. Having already secured a place in the knockout phase, Italy beat Wales 1–0 with a heavily rotated squad, with Matteo Pessina scoring the only goal in the first half to ensure the side finished with a perfect record in the group stage. Italy became the first team in European Championship history to win each group stage match without conceding.

In the round of 16 played at Wembley Stadium, Italy struggled against a very motivated and disciplined Austria, who had finished second in Group C. Austria's Marko Arnautović had a goal in the 67th minute ruled out for offside, and it was only in the first period of extra time that Italian substitutes Federico Chiesa and Pessina each delivered a goal to give Italy a 2–0 lead. Despite substitute Saša Kalajdžić salvaging a goal for Austria in the second half of extra time (the first goal conceded by the Italians at the tournament), Italy held on to reach the quarter-finals. Italy's quarter-final encounter against No. 1 FIFA World Rankings Belgium, played in Munich's Allianz Arena, saw strong Italian domination, as Nicolò Barella beat Thibaut Courtois to score in the 31st minute, before Insigne doubled Italy's lead in the 44th minute with a powerful strike; Belgium's Romelu Lukaku then converted a successful penalty during stoppage time of the first half. Despite an achilles injury in the second half to Leonardo Spinazzola that ruled him out for the rest of the tournament, Italy once again held the scoreline to eliminate the Belgians. The victory set a new record for the longest European Championship winning streak at 15, including both qualifying and the final tournament. Italy then returned to Wembley to face Spain in the semi-finals, the fourth consecutive European Championship where the two sides met. In a tight game dominated by possession football, Italy got the breakthrough from Chiesa after 60 minutes; however, 20 minutes later Álvaro Morata equalised for Spain to level the match at 1–1. No further goals were scored in extra time, resulting in a penalty shoot-out; both Locatelli and Dani Olmo failed to score the first penalties for their respective sides, before Gianluigi Donnarumma saved Spain's fourth kick from Morata. Jorginho then scored the subsequent penalty to take Italy to their first European final since 2012.

On 11 July 2021, Italy won the UEFA Euro 2020 by a 3–2 victory on penalty shoot-out after a 1–1 draw (Bonucci equalized in the second-half the opening goal of Shaw) on extra-time against England in the final. Italy won its second European Championship title 53 years after the first, won at home in 1968. On 16 July, all members of the European Championship-winning squad were awarded the Italian Order of Merit of Cavaliere.

In October 2021 Italy participated in the UEFA Nations League Finals held at home. On 6 October, Italy played the semi‐final against Spain, losing 2–1 at San Siro. This match caused the end of the record of 37 unbeaten matches, more than 3 years after the last defeat. Four days later, Italy won the third-place final 2–1 against Belgium at the Juventus Stadium. On 15 November 2021, Italy drew 0–0 with Northern Ireland in their final 2022 World Cup qualifying Group C match and finished in second place, two points behind Switzerland. Italy were then required to go through the second round of qualifying again.

On 24 March 2022, Italy lost 1–0 in the semi-final of the play-offs against North Macedonia in Palermo, at Stadio Renzo Barbera, failing to qualify for the World Cup for a second consecutive time. On 1 June 2022 Italy took part in the CONMEBOL–UEFA Cup of Champions match, rebranded as the 2022 Finalissima, losing 3–0 against Argentina in London.

Kit history

The first shirt worn by the Italian national team, in its debut against France on 15 May 1910, was white. The choice of colour was due to the fact that a decision about the appearance of the kit had not yet been made, so it was decided not to have a colour, which was why white was chosen. After two games, for a friendly against Hungary in Milan on 6 January 1911, the white shirt was replaced by a blue jersey (specifically Savoy azure) — blue being the border colour of the royal House of Savoy crest used on the flag of the Kingdom of Italy; the shirt was accompanied by white shorts and black socks (which later became blue). The team later became known as gli Azzurri (the Blues).

In the 1930s, Italy wore a black kit, ordered by the fascist regime of Benito Mussolini. The black kit debuted on 17 February 1935 in a friendly against France at the Stadio Nazionale PNF in Rome. A blue shirt, white shorts and black socks were, however, worn at the 1936 Olympic Games in Berlin the following year. At the 1938 FIFA World Cup in France, the all-black kit was worn once (in the match against France).

After World War II, the fascist regime fell and the monarchy was abolished in 1946. The same year saw the birth of the Italian Republic, and the blue-and-white kit was reinstated. The cross of the former Royal House of Savoy was removed from the flag of Italy, and consequently from the national team's badge, now consisting solely of the Tricolore''. For the 1954 FIFA World Cup, the country's name in Italian, "ITALIA", was placed above the tricolour shield, and for the 1982 FIFA World Cup, "FIGC", the abbreviation of the Italian Football Federation, was incorporated into the badge.

In 1983, to celebrate the victory at the World Cup of the previous year, three gold stars replaced the word "ITALIA" above the tricolour, representing their three World Cup victories until that point. And in 1984, a round emblem was launched, featuring the three stars, the inscriptions "ITALIA" and "FIGC", and the tricolour.

The first known kit manufacturer was Adidas in 1974. Since 2003, the kit has been made by Puma. Since the 2000s, an all-blue uniform including blue shorts has occasionally been used, particularity in international tournaments. After Italy's 2006 World Cup victory, a fourth star was added to the tricolour badge. In March 2022, after almost 20 years with Puma, it was announced that Adidas will be Italy's kit manufacturer from 2023.

Kit suppliers

Previous squads

World Cup
 1934 FIFA World Cup squad
 1938 FIFA World Cup squad
 1950 FIFA World Cup squad
 1954 FIFA World Cup squad
 1962 FIFA World Cup squad
 1966 FIFA World Cup squad
 1970 FIFA World Cup squad
 1974 FIFA World Cup squad
 1978 FIFA World Cup squad
 1982 FIFA World Cup squad
 1986 FIFA World Cup squad
 1990 FIFA World Cup squad
 1994 FIFA World Cup squad
 1998 FIFA World Cup squad
 2002 FIFA World Cup squad
 2006 FIFA World Cup squad
 2010 FIFA World Cup squad
 2014 FIFA World Cup squad

European Football Championship
 UEFA Euro 1968 squad
 UEFA Euro 1980 squad
 UEFA Euro 1988 squad
 UEFA Euro 1996 squad
 UEFA Euro 2000 squad
 UEFA Euro 2004 squad
 UEFA Euro 2008 squad
 UEFA Euro 2012 squad
 UEFA Euro 2016 squad
Confederations Cup
 2009 FIFA Confederations Cup squad
 2013 FIFA Confederations Cup squad

Notes

References

 
history
Italy
National football team